Hartuv or Har-Tuv (lit. "Mount of Goodness") was an agricultural colony in the Judean Hills established in 1883 on land purchased from the Arab village of Artuf by English missionaries. It was destroyed in the 1929 Palestine riots but was rebuilt in 1930. In 1948 it was abandoned again. Hartuv was the starting point for the Convoy of 35 during the 1948 war. Hartuv is now an industrial zone near Beit Shemesh.

History

Christian missionary colony (1882–1891)
In the early 1870s, the Spanish consul in Jerusalem bought over 5,000 dunams of land from the villagers of Artuf, which he sold to the  London Society for Promoting Christianity Amongst the Jews. After the 1882 anti-Jewish pogroms in Eastern Europe, the society used some of the money raised to help the Jewish refugees to purchase land in Artuf. Towards the end of 1883, 24 Jewish families were settled there, each receiving 150 dunams of farmland, farm animals and tools. Due to economic difficulties and the lack of water, some of the land was leased to Arabs. After living for some time in tents, a wooden hut was built where all the families lived together. They were obliged to attend Sunday meetings and send their children to the missionary school, but most of the colonists remained practicing Jews.

Har-Tuv colony (1895–1929)
In 1895, the Bulgarian Hibbat Zion movement bought the 5,000-dunam farm from the London Jews Society and renamed it Har-Tuv (lit. Mountain of Good). Twelve Jewish families settled there and tried to earn a living from agriculture. Due to the poor quality of the soil, and lack of water, seeds and work implements, life in Hartuv was a struggle. 

In his 1912-13 literary almanac, Luah le'eretz yisrael, historian Abraham Moses Luncz wrote: "Artuf (Har-Tuv), founded in 1895, about 10 minutes from D'ieban along the route of the Jerusalem-Yafo railroad, 101 inhabitants, Sephardi Jews of Bulgarian origin."

During the 1929 riots Hartuv was destroyed by Arabs. The residents fled to Jaffa.
Invoking the Collective Punishments Ordinance, the British Mandatory authorities heavily fined the Arab villages whose residents attacked the Jews of Hartuv.

New Har-Tuv and the War of Independence (1930–1948)
In 1930 Hartuv was rebuilt and some of the families returned.

According to a census conducted in 1931 by the British Mandate authorities, Har Tuv had a population of 107 inhabitants, in 24 inhabited houses.

On 20 December 1947, a Notrim truck on its way to Hartuv was attacked and its 3 passengers murdered. Since then all transportation was done in lightly armored vehicles.
On March 18, 1948 a convoy that had just finished resupplying Hartuv was ambushed on its way back to Jerusalem by the forces of Abd al-Qadir al-Husayni. 11 convoy members were killed in the battle.

The Convoy of 35 left Hartuv in an attempt to resupply and reinforce the Gush Etzion kibbutzim by foot on January 16, 1948. 35 members of the convoy were killed.

Moshav Naham

After the establishment of the State of Israel, a ma'abara transit camp was set up to accommodate the masses of new immigrants arriving from Europe and Arab lands. In 1950, Moshav Naham was founded nearby.

Archaeology
Two archaeological sites nearby are Khirbat Marmita, about 1 km east of the village, and al-Burj, on the site of Hartuv to the southwest. Excavations have been carried out on Khirbat al-Burj by the Hebrew University since 1985. Excavations in Hartuv revealed an architectural complex dating to the Early Bronze Age I period. The site includes a central courtyard surrounded by rooms on at least three sides. One of the rooms, a rectangular hall with pillar bases along its long axis, may have been a sanctuary with a line of standing stones (massebot). Another hall has a monumental entrance flanked by two monolithic doorjambs. The complex appears to have had both religious and secular functions.

Today
Today Hartuv is an industrial zone. Nesher Israel Cement Enterprises, Israel's sole producer of cement, maintains one of its three factories in Hartuv.
In 1987, Beit Or Aviva, Israel's first therapeutic community was established in Hartuv.

References

1929 Palestine riots
1883 establishments in the Ottoman Empire
Jewish villages depopulated during the 1948 Arab–Israeli War